Shoe Lake is a fresh water lake located in Kosciusko County, Indiana, United States. It is the inflow point for water entering Banning Lake (Barbee chain of lakes).

References

Shoe Lake
Lakes of Kosciusko County, Indiana